Shalom Tikva (born May 8, 1965) is an Israeli former professional footballer who played as an attacking midfielder. He made 23 appearances scoring 6 goals for the Israel national team.

Honours
Maccabi Netanya
Israeli Championship: runner-up 1987–88
Toto Cup: runner-up 1986–87

Standard de Liège
Belgian Cup: runner-up 1988–89

Hapoel Tel Aviv
Israeli Championship:1999-00; runner-up 1997–98
Israel State Cup:1999, 2000

Individual
Member of the Israeli Football Hall of Fame

References

Profile at Standard de Liège
Israel National Team – Appearances and Goalscoring

1965 births
Living people
Israeli Jews
Israeli footballers
Israel international footballers
Israeli expatriate footballers
Association football forwards
Maccabi Netanya F.C. players
Standard Liège players
RC Lens players
Neuchâtel Xamax FCS players
Hapoel Tel Aviv F.C. players
Belgian Pro League players
Ligue 1 players
Expatriate footballers in Belgium
Expatriate footballers in France
Expatriate footballers in Switzerland
Israeli expatriate sportspeople in Belgium
Israeli expatriate sportspeople in France
Israeli expatriate sportspeople in Switzerland
Footballers from Netanya